James Wesley "Wes" Brown (born January 26, 1982) is an American actor.

Life and career
Brown was born in Fort Worth, Texas and raised in Baton Rouge, Louisiana. He attended Louisiana State University. He is married to Amanda; they live in Los Angeles with their daughter.

Brown played Luke McDonald in season two of HBO's True Blood. He is also known for recurring roles as Judson Lyons in Hart of Dixie and as Ryan Kerrigan in Private Practice. Brown has starred in nine Hallmark Channel films, including Love's Everlasting Courage and Love Begins, in 2011 Christmas Cookies in 2016 and "Christmas at Graceland" in 2018. "Wedding at Graceland" in 2019. He also appeared on CSI: Miami, Criminal Minds, NCIS, Scandal and Desperate Housewives.

In 2012 Brown was cast as series regular on the NBC primetime show Deception as Julian Bowers. He also played the recurring role of Taylor in the fifth season of The CW's 90210.

In 2016 Brown made a guest appearance as Gaston on ''Once Upon a Time.

Filmography

References

External links
 

1982 births
21st-century American male actors
American male film actors
American male television actors
Living people
Male actors from Fort Worth, Texas